The women's team portable apparatus competition was one of the events of the artistic gymnastics discipline contested in the 1956 Summer Olympics in Melbourne. The portable apparatus would eventually be removed from the Women's Artistic Gymnastics competition.

From the official Report of the 1956 Summer Olympics:
Probably the most popular and spectacular item was the women's gymnastics team exercises with portable apparatus and music. It was a spectacle of controlled rhythm and concerted movement that has never been seen in Australia before. Hungary was the noteworthy winner, but public acclaim calls for mention of Sweden (second) and Rumania, with their exciting and unforgettable music and costumes.

The event would be the foundation for rhythmic gymnastics, which would debut at the 1984 Summer Olympics in Los Angeles.

Apparatus
Each team had to perform with an apparatus. The following were used in the 1956 competition. The scores would be added to the final team score.

Results

References
Official Olympic Report
www.gymnasticsresults.com
www.gymn-forum.net

Women's team portable apparatus
1956 in women's gymnastics
Women's events at the 1956 Summer Olympics